Vayas is one of the 31 barrios of the municipality of Ponce, Puerto Rico.  Along with Playa, Bucana, Canas and Capitanejo, Vayas is also one of Ponce's five coastal barrios. Together with Capitanejo, Vayas is also one of two rural coastal barrios in the municipality. It was organized in 1831, at which time it was divided into Vayas Norte and Vayas Sur; in 1878 the two were subsequently merged into today's Vayas.

History
Barrio Vayas is one of the oldest barrios in Ponce, dating from the 1780s. Its name can be seen spelled as "Bayas", "Vallas, and even "Ballas", but the official name is nowadays spelled "Vayas". It is believed that name came from the stakes used by farmers to mark the extension of their lands, in the times when those lands were used for pasturing herds.

Location
Vayas is a rural, coastal barrio located in the southern region of the municipality, east of downtown Ponce, and southeast of the traditional center of the city, Plaza Las Delicias. It is located at 18.0107°N 66.5567°W, with an elevation of 43 feet. The toponymy, or origin of the name, is related to the edges or boundary (a type of fencing) to cordon off a land area or barrio.

Boundaries
It is bounded on the North by PR-1 and La Esperanza Street, on the South by the Caribbean Sea, on the West by Bucara Street/Los Caobos Avenue, PR-52 (roughly), and the Costa Caribe Country Club East Access Road, and on the East by Río Inabón.

In terms of barrio-to-barrio boundaries, Vayas is bounded in the North by Sabanetas and Coto Laurel, in the South by the Caribbean Sea, in the West by Bucaná, and in the East by Capitanejo.

Features and demographics
Unlike most other barrios of Ponce, Vayas' landscape is entirely flat. Vayas has the third longest coastline of all five of Ponce's coastal barrios, after Canas and Playa.

In 2000, the population of Vayas was 1,338 persons, and it had a density of 188 persons per square mile.

In 2010, the population of Vayas was 901 persons, and it had a density of 127.1 persons per square mile.

The main roads serving barrio Vayas are PR-52 and PR-1.

Notable landmarks
Vayas barrio is home to Ponce's Mercedita Airport and Destileria Serralles.
  The community of Vayas Torres is among the communities located in Barrio Vayas.

Notable people from Vayas
 Carmín Vega, comedian from the Mercedita sector of Barrio Vayas.

See also

 List of communities in Puerto Rico

References

External links

 Management Plan for La Esperanza Nature Preserve in Ponce, Puerto Rico. Matthew Bourque, Drew Digeser, Stephen Partridge, Hussein Yatim. Worcester Polytechnic Institute. Worcester, Massachusetts. 2 May 2012. Retrieved 4 August 2013.

Barrio Vayas
1831 establishments in Puerto Rico
Populated coastal places in Puerto Rico